Schmidt Glacier  may refer to:
Schmidt Glacier (Antarctica)
Schmidt Glacier (Heard Island and McDonald Islands)